Pyebaek is a Korean wedding custom that is traditionally held a few days after the official ceremony, with only family members present. The ceremony begins with the older couple seated on cushions behind a table in front of a painted screen, with the newlyweds opposite them. The newlyweds perform a deep bow which begins standing and ends with the newlyweds pressing their foreheads to their hands while kneeling on the floor. The bride may present the groom's parents with jujubes (Chinese dates) and chestnuts, which symbolize children. A variation will have the newlyweds offering cups of wine, usually cheongju. The bride offers the cup to the father, and the groom offers the cup to the mother. Sometimes the parents will then also offer the newlyweds cups of cheongju or soju. The older couple then shares some wisdom on marriage from their advanced experience. Finally they will throw the jujubes and chestnuts back at the bride, who has to try catching them with her wedding skirt.

In the United States, this ritual is held a few days before the ceremony. The bride may also receive gifts of money in white envelopes.

Commercial services exist to assist those unfamiliar with how the ceremony is performed.

Reverse Acculturation 
YoungHee Kim and Sung-Yeon Park, professors at Bowling Green State University, view the resurgence of this traditional wedding practice as an example of reverse acculturation and cultural integration in which individuals both adapt to a new culture while maintaining a connection to the native culture.  By adding the Pyebaek ceremony to their wedding festivities, Korean-Americans, whether they are marrying another individual of Korean heritage or not, have begun to introduce their heritage culture into the mainstream culture of the United States.

See also 
 Marriage in South Korea
 Culture of Korea
 Hanbok
 Koreans
 Korean-Americans

References 

Korean culture
Wedding traditions